Chris Singleton may refer to:

Chris Singleton (musician) (born 1977), Irish singer/songwriter
Chris Singleton (American football) (born 1967), played in the NFL
Chris Singleton (baseball) (born 1972), center fielder in Major League Baseball
Chris Singleton (basketball, born 1989), professional basketball player
Chris Singleton (basketball, born 1957), professional basketball player, coach and commentator